Fu Xiaoqing (born 24 August 1941), better known by her pen name Dai Qing, is a journalist and activist for China-related issues; most significantly against the Three Gorges Dam Project. She left the Chinese Communist Party after the bloodshed of 1989 Tiananmen Square protests and massacre and was thereafter incarcerated for ten months at maximum security facility Qingcheng Prison. Dai is also an author who has published many influential books, articles, and journals.

Early life and education
Fu Xiaoqing was born 24 August 1941 in Chongqing, Sichuan. Her father was Fu Daqing, an activist from Jiangxi who had studied Russian in Moscow and participated in armed rebellions in Nanchang and Guangzhou; her mother, Feng Dazhang (alternatively known as Yang Jie), had good family connections and had trained as a petroleum engineer in Japan. Both were Chinese Communist Party (CCP) activists and had begun doing intelligence work for the CCP following the Japanese invasion of China in 1937. They had two more children after Xiaoqing. In 1944 or 1945, Japanese occupation forces arrested Daqing and executed him. Feng was also arrested, but eventually released.

After the Second World War ended, Xiaoqing and her mother moved to Beijing. Xiaoqing was subsequently adopted by revolutionary leader and politician Ye Jianying, a friend of her father's, and she was raised as part of his family. Xiaoqing started school and began using the name Fu Ning. Her middle school provided students with a strong liberal arts education, and Fu read widely as a child, becoming familiar with classic Russian and Western European literature before discovering American authors as a young adult. Her mother remarried.

From 1960 to 1966, Fu studied automatic missile guidance systems at the Harbin Institute of Military Engineering. While a student she also became a formal member of the CCP.

Career

Technician and spy 
After graduating in 1966, Fu was briefly employed at a research institute of the Number Seven Ministry of Machinery Industry, working on gyroscopes for intercontinental ballistic missile guidance systems. When the Cultural Revolution started that year, Fu joined the Red Guards, but soon began feeling disillusioned with the movement's political leaders. Although she had not yet reached the politically mandated age for marriage and parenthood, Fu married Wang Dejia, a model research worker she had met at the Ministry research institute. The couple soon had one child, a daughter.

From 1968 to 1971, Fu and Wang were sent to attend governmental cadre schools in Zhanjiang and Dongting Lake, where they were forced to work as labourers on a remote farm. Their daughter was taken away and given to another family to raise during this period, and Fu was not permitted to leave the farm to visit her, even though she sent most of her monthly earnings to support the child. They did not see their daughter again until after their release from farm work. In 1972, Fu and her husband returned to Beijing and worked as technicians in a surveillance equipment factory under the Ministry of Public Security. From 1978 to 1979, Fu took English lessons at the PLA Foreign Languages Institute in Nanjing. She had noticed a widespread lack of children's books for Chinese children and was interested in translating English books for her daughter.

Fu published a short story in November 1979 – her first published work – and at this point began using the name Dai Qing. While studying at the Foreign Languages Institute, she had been recruited by the Chinese army's intelligence department. Because of her writing skills and English ability, she was assigned to join the Chinese Writers Association, make foreign contacts, and spy on writers taking part in international exchange programs. Her career as a spy turned out to be short-lived: her cover was blown by a colleague who gave a list of army personnel to the CIA, and Dai subsequently left the army in 1982.

In 1982, she left the Army and joined Guangming Daily (光明日報) as a news reporter.

Early life as a journalist
In 1966, Dai Qing graduated from the Harbin Military Engineering Academy (哈爾濱軍事工程學院), predcessor of National University of Defense Technology. After graduation, she furthered her studies in Japan to become an oil engineer, and she was also trained as a missile engineer. In the same year, she worked as an engineer in a top secret plant which specialized in intercontinental missiles. After working as an engineer, she started her career as a writer/news reporter.

She was noticed in 1969 when the Guangming Daily published her short story which depicted the plight of a husband and a wife separated during the Cultural Revolution. As a result, she joined the Chinese Authors Association (中國作者協會) in 1982. After publishing the short fiction, "Pan" ("盼"), she was paid high tribute as an author.

She then became a reporter for the Guangming Daily (光明日報) (Enlightenment Daily) and she remained as a columnist from 1982 to 1989. Dai was the first Chinese journalist to announce the views and points of dissidents — people such as astrophysicist Fang Lizhi (方勵之), who held different political views.

At that time, Dai was a dedicated patriot. She once said that she would die if Mao Zedong (毛澤東) needed her to do so—but after three to five years, she gradually changed her stance. Dai wanted to understand her community and the lives of ordinary citizens through the eyes of a journalist. She hoped to be able to contribute to the community.

Dai has a quixotic style of sudden asides in her writing, which may occasionally confuse the reader. At times, her biting sarcasm may be lost on those not intimately acquainted with China's political and journalistic culture.

Opposition against the Three Gorges Dam
In 1979, when Dai Qing returned from France to China, she was sent south to cover the Sino-Vietnamese War. At that period, she decided to reveal the dark side of the Three Gorges Dam. As a famous and fearless China journalist and writer, Dai hoped her writing would encourage Chinese people to speak out and avoid repeating past mistakes. Thus, she openly opposed the Three Gorges Dam Project (三峽工程) on the Yangtze River (長江) in 1989. She regarded the project as "the most environmentally and socially destructive project in the world".

She collected a lot of information on the project which led to the publication of the book Yangtze! Yangtze! (是否该进行长江三峡水坝的工程). The information included interviews and essays from the Chinese scientists and journalists who also opposed the project. During the period, a conference was held in the Hall of Chinese People's Political Forum about the Three Gorges Dam, and Dai was the only reporter who attended and reported the forum. She even went to Japan in 1996 to ask the Japanese government not to provide loans or any kind of financial assistance for that project.

She argued that there was already serious emigration today, either legal or illegal, from China to other countries, like Canada, the United States, Europe and so on. The project would create a large number of refugees who had to find a place for them to reside. As a result, the legal or illegal emigration problem would be aggravated. In addition, the project would have had global effect on the climate. Dai claimed that there was a potential risk for both the Yangtze River (長江) and the Yellow River (黃河) to dry up, leading the sandstorms in Inner Mongolia to have a greater influence on Korea, Japan and even the west coast of the United States.

Life as a prominent journalist

Besides publishing Yangtze! Yangtze!, she also authored many books to share her opinions, especially about the Three Gorges Dam project such as The River Dragon Has Come! (水龍來了!). However, Yangtze! Yangtze! was banned after the 1989 Tiananmen Square protests and massacre.

Because of that event, she was denounced on June 4, 1989, and quit the Chinese Communist Party on June 5, 1989.

Turning point for Dai

Dai Qing took part in the opposition of the Three Gorges Dam project because, as a journalist, she thought that the project was environmentally destructive. Around 1986, a group of old respected Chinese scientists, including Zhou Peiyuan 周培源 and Lin Hua (林華), visited Three Gorges to inspect the region for dam construction. One day a conference was held in the Hall of the Chinese People’s Political Forum about Three Gorges which The Ministry of Media told the press not to report. As the only journalist who went to the conference, Dai did not know much about the Three Gorges Dam project. However, after the conference, she found the scientists to be very reasonable.

Dai's turning point came in 1987 when she made a visit to Hong Kong. She saw that every journalist and intellectual were free to express their opinions on the Three Gorges Dam project on the Yangtze River, and she was touched by their concerns for China. However, since the Chinese media was controlled by the Chinese government, even citizens who were most susceptible to the disastrous effects of the Three Gorges Dam project knew nothing about the disadvantages of building the dam. She felt ashamed because the Hong Kong media was way ahead of China's. Extremely anxious, Dai felt that it was her responsibility to let people know the opposing views about the Three Gorges Dam project. Therefore, she decided to publish a book to voice her concerns. Eventually she met a writer named Lin Feng, and after he discovered her concerns about the Three Gorges, he mailed her all the Hong Kong newspaper articles related to this issue.

Life in prison
In 1989, the student protest movement broke out. Dai Qing joined other scholars by calling on the government to curtail corruption and support democratic reform. When students staged large protests that included a hunger strike in Tiananmen Square, Dai Qing made a passionate speech there, encouraging students to leave peacefully to avoid bloodshed. If they stayed, she warned, they could provoke a violent crackdown that could seriously set back the process of reform. She was not heeded, and the crackdown came on June 4.

After the incident, many scholars either went into hiding, were detained, or fled overseas. Dai Qing, not knowing whether to flee or not, only managed to make phone calls everyday to comfort her friends and relatives. According to one of her famous books, Wo de Ruyu (My Imprisonment; 我的入獄), Dai mentioned that the police had visited her the day before her imprisonment as a way of warning her. However, she did not plan to run away for her life because she loved her country. She said, "As a citizen of a country, I cannot leave her. And I have to criticise it in order to build a more perfect and stronger one."

Dai Qing was arrested in July 1989 and imprisoned on the charge of "advocating bourgeois liberalization and instigating civil unrest." She spent the next ten months at maximum security facility Qingcheng Prison. She was formally denounced by her former co-workers at Guangming Daily, and in September of that year the Press and Publication Bureau banned domestic sales of her writings.

Upon her release in May 1990, Dai Qing was forbidden from further publication within China. The government kept her under surveillance and restricted her ability to travel. She was offered political asylum by the United States and Germany, but turned them both down. Instead, she wrote a book about her time in Qingcheng titled My Imprisonment (我的入獄), which she was able to have published in Hong King and Taiwan. Her daughter graduated from Beijing University that year, but was denied further opportunities for study after she refused to formally denounce her mother.

In her book, she said, "What I can fight for is to let others know I am innocent but have a rebellious spirit."

As a former reporter for the Guangming Daily, she used to write frequently. However, her imprisonment after the publication of the Yangtze! Yangtze! made her change. From Wo de Ruyu, she declared she would no longer be a reporter. Since she was no longer a member of the Communist Party, she said, "They (the Communist Party) will probably give me up, but I will not be glad to work with them neither."

Later life
Dai Qing argues that China has not yet abolished the mode of collective society from the previous eras. Therefore, she continues to fight for human rights, democracy, and environmentalism along with people in both China and the West.

From 2003–2004, Dai Qing held the position of Weissberg Chair in Human Rights and Social Justice at Beloit College, spending time in residency on campus.

In 2009, Dai Qing and poet Bei Ling were scheduled to speak at a Frankfurt Book Fair event about contemporary issues in China. However, the event was jointly hosted with China (the book fair's guest of honour that year), and both writers were removed from the list of speakers after Chinese officials demanded their exclusion. Dai Qing told press she would be attending the fair even if she were not permitted to formally speak. The following year, after jailed human rights activist Liu Xiaobo was named a Nobel Peace Prize recipient, his wife Liu Xia asked other Chinese activists and dissidents to attend the award ceremony in support of him, and Dai Qing confirmed that she would be among those in attendance.

As of 2016, Dai Qing was living in Shunyi, Beijing, and continuing to write.

Fellowships and awards
From 1991–1992, Dai Qing held a Nieman Fellowship at Harvard University. In recognition of work supporting freedom of the press, she received the 1992 Golden Pen of Freedom award from the World Association of News Publishers, and a PEN International Award. In 1993 she was awarded a Goldman Environmental Prize and the Condé Nast Traveler Environmental Award, and accepted a fellowship at the Columbia University School of Journalism. She used her time there to complete research for her book Wang Shiwei and "Wild Lilies": Reflection and Purges in the Chinese Communist Party, 1942–1944.

She held a fellowship at the Woodrow Wilson International Center from 1998–1999, and in 2007 she took up a year-long fellowship at Australian National University.

Works

Books
No: A Collection of Short Stories (不 : 中短篇小說集) (1982)
Spring Story of the Red Rock (紅岩英魂逢春記) (Meng #Yong, Dai Qing, Li Jiajie/孟勇, 戴晴, 李家杰著){China-History-Civil War}(1983)
Spirit (魂){Collection of Articles} (1985)
Red Alert: Report of the Da Xing An Ling Forest Fires (紅色警報: 大興安嶺森林大火直擊報導) {Report}(1987)
Liang Shuming, Zhang Shizhao and Mao Zedong (梁漱溟,章士釗與毛澤東){China-Interllectual Life} (1988)
Series of the Chinese National Women (中國女性系列) {Report}(1988)
Readers' Questions and Answers (學者答問錄) {China-Interllectual-Interview}(1988)
Chasing the Devil and God (追逐魔鬼撾住上帝) {Collection of Articles}(1988)
Away from Modern Superstitions (走出現代迷信) (Tao Ling, Zhang Yide, Dai Qing et al./ 陶鎧, 張義德, 戴晴等著) {Philosophy, Marxist}(1988)
Sexually Open Women (性開放女子 ) (Dai Qing et al./ 戴晴等著){Chinese Fiction} (1988)
Yangtze! Yangtze! (揚子! 揚子!) {Reservoirs-China-Yangtze River-Environmental aspects}(1989)It was banned when it was first published in 1989 when the democracy movement in China became active. It is a collection of essays, interviews, statements, points of views and articles from Chinese scientists, environmentalists, journalists and intellectuals who all opposed the Three Gorges Dam scheme. Its credits lie in the fact that it successfully pressured the Chinese government to postpone the implementation of the scheme and it signaled as the first time which democratic movement could interfere with state decisions.
Chang Jiang, Chang Jiang: Arguments Regarding the Three Gorges Dam Project (長江長江 : 三峽工程論爭) (主編戴晴 ; 副主編剛建, 何小娜, 董郁玉 ){Dams-China-Yangtze River Gorges}(1989)
Whether to Continue with the Three Gorges Dam Project: Readers' Collection of Arguments (長江三峽工程應否興建 : 學者論爭文集) (主編戴晴 ; 副主編剛建, 何小娜, 董郁玉){Dams-China-Yangtze River Gorges}(1989)
China's Lack of Interest Regarding Sex: A Collection of Questions from the Mainland Society (中國的性苦悶 : 大陸社會問題紀實){Social Problems-China} (1989)
An Offering to the Heart(心祭) {Chinese Fiction}(1989)
Liang Shuming, Wang Shiwei, Chu Anping (梁漱溟, 王實味, 儲安平) {Intellectuals-China}(1989)
Away from Modern Superstitions: Arguments on Rational Questions (Chen Ling, Zhang Yide, Dai Qing et al.) (走出現代迷信: 關於真理標準問題的大辯論 / 陶鎧, 張義德, 戴晴等著) {Philosophy-Marxist}(1989)
My Imprisonment (我的入獄) {Political prisoners-China-Daires}(1990)
Mo Takuto to Chūgoku chishikijin: Enan seifu kara han uha toso e (毛澤東と中國知識人: 延安整風から反右派鬥爭) (1990)
Mao Zedong, Influencing the World, "Wild Lily" (毛澤東, 黨天下, 野百合花) (1991)
Sentimental Writing for Women (Dai Qing et al.) (齋女 : 女性感抒文學 / 戴晴等著) (1993)
Wang Shiwei and 'Wild Lilies': Rectification and Purges in the Chinese Communist Party (1942–1944) (王實味與野百合花) (1994)
My Account II of Imprisonment at Qin City (在秦城坐牢 : 自己的故事(二)) (1995) In this book, Dai talked about her life in prison and what she thought and saw there. Also, this book included what Dai wrote to her husband, daughter and the police at that time. And she talked about her opinion on June 4 incident and the immigration problem when she went to the United States to study at Harvard University.
Women Who Keep Small Feet: Problems of the Women in Contemporary China (纏足女子 : 當代中國女性問題) (Dai Qing, Luo Ke/戴晴, 洛恪著)(1996) In this book, Dai and Luo give a message to the public. They want the society to pay attention to the problems of the women in China. There are seven chapters in this book spanning such subjects as women who persist in the practice of foot-binding, bigamy, a modern matchmaker and a girl who is raped at the age of nine. In this book, Dai shows herself a unique and critical view on current gender issues.
Whose River: Can a Developing China be Responsible of the Three Gorges Dam Project (誰的長江 : 發展中的中國能否承擔三峽工程) (Dai Qing, Xue Weijia) (編者戴晴, 薛煒嘉) (1996)
The River Dragon Has Come! (水龍來了!) (1997) A book in which Dai Qing gave stern warning to prominent government officials, journalists, intellectuals and the public in China about the disastrous effect which the Three Gorges Dam project might bring to the environment and society of China. Dai Qing also gave a few suggestions on how to achieve the same goal with less catastrophic effects entailed.
Tiananmen Follies: Prison Memoirs and Other Writings (2003)
The Most Dammed Country in the World (2021)

Articles
(with Jeanne Tai), "Raised Eyebrows for Raise the Red Lantern," Public Culture 5(2): 333-337 (1993).
Members of Falungong in an Autocratic Society 2000: Dai Qing contended that China was still based on the mode of collective idea of the previous era. While the members of Falungong gathered together to cultivate their own ideas and worshipped their own god, the Chinese government saw it as a kind a deviation. She criticized the Chinese government for deploying the usual tactics of suppression to crush against Falungong members. Dai claimed that this event represents the greatest conflicts when China steps towards modernity. This article is based on her lecture at the Fairbank Center, Harvard University on November 18, 1999.

See also 

 List of Chinese women writers
 Mass media in China
 Women’s roles during the Tiananmen Square Protests of 1989

References

Websites
Goldman Environmental Prize
Communism's Negotiated Collapse: The Polish Round Table Talks of 1989
Three Gorges Dam Project
The article about Dai Qing (Chinese)
 
Dai Qing, Voice of the Yangtze River Gorges
Three Gorges Probe news service

External links 

 Excerpt from Dai Qing's My Imprisonment (September 1, 1992), freely available via SAGE Publications

People's Republic of China journalists
Chinese environmentalists
Chinese women environmentalists
1941 births
Living people
Nieman Fellows
Charter 08 signatories
Short story writers from Chongqing
20th-century Chinese short story writers
Chinese women short story writers
20th-century women writers
People's Republic of China short story writers
Goldman Environmental Prize awardees